The A11 is a  road to the South African border at Ramotswa. It is used to bypass Gaborone in reaching the Botswana-South Africa border.

References

Roads in Botswana